The 1958 Round Australia Trial, officially the Mobilgas Trial was the ninth running of the Round Australia Trial. The rally took place between 20 August and 7 September 1958. The event covered 16,250 kilometres around Australia. It was won by Eddie Perkins and Arthur Smith, driving a Volkswagen 1200.

Results

References

Rally competitions in Australia
Round Australia Trial